L'immorale is a 1967 Italian comedy film directed by Pietro Germi. It was entered into the 1967 Cannes Film Festival.

Cast
 Ugo Tognazzi as Sergio Masini
 Stefania Sandrelli as Marisa Malagugini
 Renée Longarini as Giulia Masini
 Maria Grazia Carmassi as Adele Baistrocchi
 Gigi Ballista as Don Michele
 Sergio Fincato as Calasanti
 Marco Della Giovanna as Riccardo Masini
 Ildebrando Santafe as Caputo
 Riccardo Billi as Filiberto Malagugini
 Carlo Bagno as Mr. Malagugini
 Lina Lagalla as Mrs. Malagugini
 Stefano Chierchiè as Bruno
 Costantino Bramini as Nini
 Cinzia Sperapani as Luisa
 Mimosa Gregoretti as Mita
 Giorgio Bianchi as Doctor

References

External links

1967 films
Italian comedy films
1960s Italian-language films
1967 comedy films
Italian black-and-white films
Films directed by Pietro Germi
Films scored by Carlo Rustichelli
1960s Italian films